New Temple may refer to:

Temple Church, London, England
Third Temple, to be built on the Temple Mount

See also
New Synagogue